The Hirișești is a right tributary of the river Gilort in Romania. It flows into the Gilort in Pociovaliștea.

References

Rivers of Romania
Rivers of Gorj County